The Sheridan Main Street Historic District, in Sheridan, Wyoming, is a  historic district which was listed on the National Register of Historic Places in 1982.

It includes both sides of several blocks of Main Street, from Burkitt Street to Mandel Street, an area including the oldest portion of the historic core of Sheridan, dating back to 1882. It included 57 contributing buildings.

References

Historic districts on the National Register of Historic Places in Wyoming
National Register of Historic Places in Sheridan County, Wyoming
Late 19th and Early 20th Century American Movements architecture
Buildings and structures completed in 1882